Kevin Michael Costner (born January 18, 1955) is an American actor, producer, film director and musician. He has received various accolades, including two Academy Awards, three Golden Globe Awards, a Primetime Emmy Award, and two Screen Actors Guild Awards.

Costner starred in Fandango, American Flyers, Silverado and many other films. He rose to prominence  with his starring roles in The Untouchables and No Way Out (1987).  He then starred in Bull Durham (1988), Field of Dreams (1989), Dances with Wolves (1990), for which he won two Academy Awards, JFK (1991), Robin Hood: Prince of Thieves (1991), The Bodyguard (1992), A Perfect World (1993), and Wyatt Earp (1994). In 1995, Costner starred in and co-produced Waterworld.  His second directorial feature, The Postman, was released in 1997. He later starred in Message in a Bottle (1999), For Love of the Game (1999), Thirteen Days (2000), 3000 Miles to Graceland (2001), Dragonfly (2002),  
Open Range (2003), 
Rumor Has It (2005), The Guardian (2006), Mr. Brooks (2007), 3 Days to Kill (2014), McFarland, USA (2015), Draft Day (2014), and Criminal (2016). He has also played supporting parts in such films as The Upside of Anger (2005), Man of Steel (2013), Hidden Figures (2016), Molly's Game (2017), and Let Him Go (2020).

On television, Costner portrayed Devil Anse Hatfield in the miniseries Hatfields & McCoys (2012), winning the Primetime Emmy Award for Outstanding Lead Actor in a Limited or Anthology Series or Movie. Since 2018, he has starred as John Dutton on the Paramount Network original drama series Yellowstone for which he received a Screen Actors Guild Award nomination and a Golden Globe award.

Early life
Costner was born on January 18, 1955, in Lynwood, California, and grew up in Compton, California. He is the youngest of three boys, the second of whom died at birth. His mother, Sharon Rae (née Tedrick), was a welfare worker, and his father, William Costner, was an electrician and, later, a utilities executive at Southern California Edison. His father's heritage originates with German immigrants to North Carolina in the 1700s, and Costner also has English, Irish, Scottish, and Welsh ancestry. Costner was raised Baptist. He was not academically inclined in school, but did enjoy sports (especially football), took piano lessons, wrote poetry, and sang in the First Baptist Choir. He has stated that a viewing of the 1963 film How the West Was Won at the age of seven had "formed" his childhood.

He has described spending his teenage years in different parts of California as his father's career progressed, as a period when he "lost a lot of confidence", having to make new friends often. Costner lived in Ventura, then in Visalia. He attended Mt. Whitney High School where he was in the marching band. Following a move to Orange County, Costner graduated from Villa Park High School in 1973. He played baseball at Villa Park and was teammates with Dennis Burtt. He earned a BA in marketing and finance from California State University, Fullerton (CSUF) in 1978. While at CSUF, he became a brother in the Delta Chi fraternity.

Costner became interested in acting and dancing while in his last year of college, and upon graduation, he married Cindy Silva, who worked at Disneyland as Cinderella. The couple honeymooned in Puerto Vallarta; on the return plane journey, they had a chance encounter with actor Richard Burton, who had purchased all the seats around him for solitude. Burton agreed to speak to Costner after he finished reading his book. Costner, who had been taking acting classes but had not told his wife about his desire to be an actor, watched Burton closely and approached when Burton gestured. Costner told Burton that he would prefer to avoid the drama that followed Burton and asked if he would have to tolerate that if he became an actor. Burton replied, "You have blue eyes, I have blue eyes. I think you'll be fine." After the plane landed, Burton's limousine pulled up to the curb where Costner and his wife were waiting for a taxi. Burton wished Costner good luck, and the two never met again. Costner credits Burton with partially contributing to his career.
Having agreed to undertake a job as a marketing executive, Costner began taking acting lessons five nights a week, with the support of his wife. His marketing job lasted 30 days. He took work which allowed him to develop his acting skills via tuition, including working on fishing boats, as a truck driver, and giving tours of stars' Hollywood homes to support the couple while he also attended auditions.

Career
Costner made his film debut in the film Sizzle Beach, U.S.A. (known originally as Hot Malibu Summer). Filmed in the winter of 1978–79, the film was not released until 1981 and re-released in 1986. The release complications and lack of documentation led many to believe that Costner's debut was in The Touch (also known as Stacy's Knights), in 1983 with Eve Lilith and Andra Millian. Costner made a brief appearance in the Ron Howard film Night Shift (1982). He is listed in the credits as 'Frat Boy No. 1' and appears at the climax of a frat-style, blow-out party in the New York City morgue, when the music is suddenly stopped by a frantic Henry Winkler. Costner can be seen holding a beer and looking surprised at the sudden halt of celebration.

Costner appeared in a commercial for the Apple Lisa and Table for Five in 1983, and, the same year, had a small role in the nuclear holocaust film Testament. Later, he was cast in The Big Chill and filmed several scenes that were planned as flashbacks, but they were removed from the final cut. His role was that of Alex, the friend who committed suicide, the event that brings the rest of the cast together.  Costner was a friend of director Lawrence Kasdan, who promised the actor a role in a future project. That became Silverado (1985) and a breakout role for Costner. He also starred that year in the smaller films Fandango and American Flyers and appeared alongside Kiefer Sutherland in an hour-long special episode of Steven Spielberg's Amazing Stories.

Costner achieved movie star status in 1987, when he starred as federal agent Eliot Ness in The Untouchables and in the leading role of the thriller No Way Out. He solidified his A-list status in the baseball-themed films Bull Durham (1988) and Field of Dreams (1989). In 1990, he partnered with producer Jim Wilson to form the production company Tig Productions. Tig's first film was the epic Dances with Wolves which Costner directed and starred in. This film was nominated for 12 Academy Awards and won seven, including two for him personally (Best Picture and Best Director). The same year saw the release of Revenge, in which he starred along with Anthony Quinn and Madeleine Stowe, directed by Tony Scott; Costner had wanted to direct it himself.

Costner followed with Robin Hood: Prince of Thieves (1991); the Oliver Stone-directed JFK (1991); The Bodyguard (1992); and Clint Eastwood's A Perfect World (1993); all of which provided box office or critical acclaim. He took the title role in the biopic Wyatt Earp (1994), directed by Kasdan. The War, also made in 1994, seemed to gain little attention. The science fiction-post-apocalyptic epics Waterworld (1995) and The Postman (1997), the latter of which Costner also directed, were both commercial disappointments and both largely regarded by critics as artistic failures. However, while Waterworld achieved respectable box office and some positive reviews, results for The Postman were far worse and it ended up winning five Golden Raspberry Awards, including Worst Picture, Worst Actor and Worst Director for Costner. Costner starred in the golf comedy Tin Cup (1996) for Ron Shelton, who had previously directed him in Bull Durham. He developed the film Air Force One and was set to play the lead role of the President, but ultimately decided to concentrate on finishing The Postman instead. He personally offered the project to Harrison Ford. In 1999, he starred in Message in a Bottle  with Robin Wright, based on the novel of the same name by Nicholas Sparks. The film drew mixed reviews and just about broke even at the box office.

His career revived somewhat in 2000 with Thirteen Days, in which he portrayed Kenneth O'Donnell, a top adviser to John F. Kennedy. The western Open Range, which he directed and starred in, received critical acclaim in 2003, and was a surprise success commercially. He received some of his best reviews for his supporting role as retired professional baseball player Denny Davies in The Upside of Anger, for which he received a nomination from the Broadcast Film Critics Association and won the San Francisco Film Critics Circle Award for Best Supporting Actor. After that, Costner starred in The Guardian and in Mr. Brooks, in which he portrayed a serial killer. In 2008, his Tig Productions company closed and was changed to Tree House Films. In 2008, Costner starred in Swing Vote. He starred opposite Jennifer Aniston in the 2005 movie Rumour Has It. Costner was honored on September 6, 2006, when his hand and foot prints were set in concrete in front of Grauman's Chinese Theatre alongside those of other celebrated actors and entertainers. In 2010, he appeared in The Company Men alongside Ben Affleck, Tommy Lee Jones and Chris Cooper. It debuted at the Sundance Film Festival, and received good reviews. It was released in cinemas worldwide in January 2011. The film was considered to be an Oscar contender, but did not get a nomination.

Costner announced that he would be returning to the director's chair for the first time in seven years, in 2011, with A Little War of Our Own. He was also about to team up again with director Kevin Reynolds in Learning Italian. No updates have been released about either film since their original production announcement.

He also appears, as a special cameo, in Funny or Die "Field of Dreams 2: NFL Lockout". Costner portrayed Jonathan Kent in the rebooted Superman film Man of Steel, directed by Zack Snyder. Costner was going to have a role in Quentin Tarantino's Django Unchained, but had to drop out due to scheduling conflicts.

Costner starred in the three-part miniseries Hatfields & McCoys, which premiered on May 28, 2012, on the History Channel. It broke a record by pulling 13.9 million viewers. The miniseries tells the true American story of a legendary family feud – one that spanned decades and nearly launched a war between Kentucky and West Virginia. The role earned Costner the 2012 Emmy Award for Outstanding Lead Actor in a Miniseries or a Movie, the 2013 Screen Actors Guild Award for Outstanding Performance by a Male Actor in a Miniseries or Television Movie, and the 2013 Golden Globe Award for Best Performance by an Actor in a Limited Series or a Motion Picture Made for Television.

In 2014, Costner appeared in the spy movie Jack Ryan: Shadow Recruit, as Thomas Harper, a mentor for the series' title character. The same year, he starred in the thriller 3 Days to Kill and the drama Draft Day and produced and starred in Black or White. Black or White premiered at the 2014 Toronto International Film Festival and opened in the United States in 2015. In 2015, Costner played coach Jim White in the drama film McFarland, USA, about cross-country running. In 2016, he played the fictional character Al Harrison, a NASA Space Task Group supervisor, in Hidden Figures, and in 2017, he starred with Jessica Chastain in Aaron Sorkin's directorial debut film Molly's Game. Since 2018, he has starred in and produced the television series Yellowstone, marking the first regular TV series role of his career.

In 2019, Costner starred in The Art of Racing in the Rain, where he voiced Enzo the dog. It was his first voice-over film in his career.

In August 2022, Costner began production on Horizon, a Western epic that will be split into at least four films, each just under three hours in length. Costner plans on the films being released over a series of months. Costner will act as director of the project and said the film was proposed as an event television series. Production on the first film is expected to last at least 220 days, and then production of the next films will commence in April 2023.

Other ventures

Country music

Costner is the singer in Kevin Costner & Modern West, a country rock band which he founded with the encouragement of his wife Christine. In October 2007, they began a worldwide tour which included shows in Istanbul and Rome. The group also performed at NASCAR Sprint Cup Series races at Daytona International Speedway and Charlotte Motor Speedway in Concord, North Carolina.

The band released a country album, Untold Truths, on November 11, 2008, on Universal South Records. The album peaked at No. 61 on the Billboard Top Country Albums and No. 35 on the Top Heatseekers chart. Three singles ("Superman 14", "Long Hot Night" and "Backyard") have been released to radio, although none have charted. For the single "Superman 14" a live music video was made.

In 2009, they went on tour with opening act The Alternate Routes. In August, at the Big Valley Jamboree in Camrose, Alberta, Costner and the band were scheduled next on stage when a severe thunderstorm struck, causing the stage and stands on the main stage to collapse. One person was reported dead and forty injured. Later, an auction was held to raise money for the two young sons of the woman killed. A dinner with Costner was auctioned off for $41,000. Two guitars, one autographed by Costner, helped raise another $10,000 each.

A second Kevin Costner and Modern West album, Turn It On, was released in February 2010 in Europe and was supported by a European tour. In July 2012, the band performed in Halifax, Nova Scotia, at the 20th annual Telus World Skins Game in support of the IWK Health Centre Foundation, donating a guitar autographed by Costner.

Kevin Costner has also appeared in the documentary film Country Roads by Marieke Schröder.

The most recent album released by Kevin Costner and Modern West, Tales from Yellowstone, was written by Costner and his co-writers from the perspective of John Dutton, Costner's character on the hit TV series Yellowstone. Songs from the album were featured on Season 3 of the show.

Baseball
Several of Costner's films have included a baseball theme: Chasing Dreams, Bull Durham, Field of Dreams, For Love of the Game, and The Upside of Anger, in three of which his character is a pro baseball player and one a former pro baseball player.

Costner has a home in Austin, Texas, and sometimes appears at Texas Longhorns baseball practices and games. He was a close friend of former Longhorns baseball coach Augie Garrido from Garrido's days coaching at Cal State Fullerton, Costner's alma mater. He cast Garrido to play the role of the Yankee manager in For Love of the Game. He tries to attend every College World Series game that CSUF Titans plays in Omaha, Nebraska. Costner walked-on for a try-out, but did not make the team early in his time at the university.

Costner was a partial owner of the Zion, Illinois-based Lake County Fielders independent baseball team in the North American League. The Fielders name was an homage to Field of Dreams, with the logo showing a ballplayer standing amid a field of corn. On August 12, 2021, he led the New York Yankees and Chicago White Sox onto the field prior to the MLB at Field of Dreams game held in Dyersville, Iowa and gave a short speech.

Business interests

In 1995, Costner began developing oil separation machines based on a patent he purchased from the US government. The machines developed by the company were of little commercial interest until the Deepwater Horizon oil spill, when BP took six of the machines from a company in which Costner owned an interest, Ocean Therapy Solutions, for testing in late May 2010. On June 16, 2010, BP entered into a lease with Ocean Therapy Solutions for 32 of the oil-water separation devices. Although Spyron Contoguris and Stephen Baldwin previously sold their interests in Ocean Therapy Solutions in mid-June to another investor in the company, they filed a lawsuit in Louisiana District Court claiming $10.64 million for securities fraud and misrepresentation. The suit claimed that Costner kept a meeting with BP secret from them, and the secret meeting resulted in an $18-million down payment on a $52 million purchase, and that after the down payment, but before any announcement, another investor used part of the down payment to buy out their shares, thus excluding them from their share of the profits from the total sale. The suit claimed that, despite public statements by Costner, Ocean Therapy Solutions, BP and others to the contrary, Baldwin and Contogouris were told that BP was still testing the machines and had not yet committed to lease the machines from Ocean Therapy Solutions and that the other investor in Ocean Therapy Solutions purchased their shares for $1.4 million to Baldwin and $500,000, to Contogouris. In June 2012, a federal jury in Louisiana deliberated for less than 2 hours before rejecting Baldwin's and Contogouris' claims in the multimillion-dollar oil-clean-up case, and the court ordered Baldwin and Contogouris to reimburse Costner and the other defendants in the case for their costs.

On June 6, 2004, Costner opened Tatanka: The Story of the Bison one mile south of Deadwood, South Dakota, on U.S. Route 85, saying he hoped it would be an educational and emotional place for people to learn about America's westward expansion. Promoters stated in a news release that the $5-million attraction had a new, 3,800-square-foot interactive center featuring exhibits, retail, and food and beverage areas, as well as offices and a small theater. The visitor center features graphics and text about the bison and the relationship of the Plains Indians to the animals - historically hunting and now raising them for food and clothing, among other things. The centerpiece is a bronze sculpture depicting a buffalo jump by Hill City artist Peggy Detmers, depicting 14 bronze bison in the act of running from their pursuers and three bronze Lakota riders on horseback. Three of the massive bison are posed in midair, cascading over the face of a cliff. Costner commissioned the work in 1994 from Detmers. The five-fourths-scale bronzes, each weighing between 2,500 and 8,000 pounds, were cast at Eagle Bronze Foundry in Lander, Wyoming.

Costner opened the Midnight Star Casino and Restaurant in Deadwood, S.D., in 1991. He hired Francis and Carla Caneva to manage the establishment and gave each of them a 3.25 percent ownership and paid them salaries and bonuses. He terminated their employment in July 2004 and asked to agree to an amicable disassociation. When they declined, Costner dissolved the partnership and hired an accountant who determined its fair market value to be $3.1 million. The Canevas sued Costner to buy their shares based on twice that amount or sell the company on the open market. They won in the lower court but, on Costner's appeal, lost in the South Dakota Supreme Court. Costner closed the establishment in 2017 and sold it in 2020.

In 2020, Costner joined Woody Sears's new audio entertainment travel app, HearHere, as a co-founder, podcast narrator, and investor. Costner narrates some of the audio stories provided by the iPhone subscription app for travelers on road trips across the United States who want to hear about the people, places, and histories they are encountering on their travels.

Philanthropy
Costner serves on an honorary board for the National World War I Museum in Kansas City, Missouri. In spring 2011, he recorded two radio spots for the museum that were aired on Kansas City Royals Radio Network.

NASCAR
Costner was named ceremonial Grand Marshal of the NASCAR Cup Series' Auto Club 500 which took place on February 25, 2007, at the California Speedway. In 2008, he worked with the NASCAR Media Group and CMT Films to help produce the NASCAR Documentary The Ride of Their Lives which was released in December of that year. Costner would be the narrator for that documentary. Also in 2009, he was named the spokesman for NASCAR Day which took place on May 15. The next day, May 16, he and his country music band would perform in the infield of Charlotte Motor Speedway as well as participate as a judge in the 2nd annual Victory Challenge before the 25th Running of the NASCAR Sprint All-Star Race.

Writing 
In 2015, Costner co-authored The Explorer's Guild: A Passage to Shambhala, a hybrid adventure novel and graphic novel, with John Baird, researcher Stephen C. Meyer, and illustrator Rick Ross.

Costner has a chapter giving advice in Tim Ferriss' book Tools of Titans.

Personal life

Costner has been married twice and has seven children from three relationships. In 1975 while in college, Costner started dating fellow student Cindy Silva, and they married three years later. During their marriage, they had three children: daughters Annie (b. 1984) and Lily (b. 1986), and son Joe (b. 1988). The couple divorced in 1994 after 16 years of marriage. He has a son, Liam Timothy (b. 1996), with Bridget Rooney, with whom he had a brief relationship following his divorce, and then dated political activist Birgit Cunningham. In 1996, he lived with supermodel Elle Macpherson.

On September 25, 2004, Costner married his girlfriend of four years, model and handbag designer Christine Baumgartner, at his ranch in Aspen, Colorado. They have three children: sons Cayden (b. 2007) and Hayes (b. 2009), and daughter Grace (b. 2010).

Political activism
Early in his life, Costner was a Republican. He was a supporter and good friend of Ronald Reagan, frequently playing golf with the former president. He eventually switched his affiliation in the early 1990s. Since 1992, Costner has financially supported a variety of Democratic politicians, including Al Gore and Tom Daschle, but also made contributions to Republican Phil Gramm as late as 1995. He said publicly in 2008 that he has no ambition to run for political office, adding "I've lived quite a colorful life".

In the final days before the 2008 election, Costner campaigned for Barack Obama, visiting various places in Colorado, where he has a home. In his speech, Costner stated the need for young voters to get to the polls, early and with enthusiasm. "We were going to change the world and we haven't", Costner said at a Colorado State University rally. "My generation didn't get it done, and we need you to help us".

In October 2014, Costner sent a tribute to British troops serving around the world thanking them for their work.

On December 22, 2019, Costner endorsed Democratic presidential candidate Pete Buttigieg at a rally in Indianola, Iowa. Later Costner supported Democratic candidate Joe Biden.
In 2022 Costner endorsed Liz Cheney for reelection.

Awards and nominations

Honors

Filmography

References

External links

 
 
 
 
 
 Kevin Costner interview on KVUE in 1987 about The Untouchables from Texas Archive of the Moving Image

1955 births
20th-century American male actors
21st-century American male actors
American country singer-songwriters
American film producers
American male film actors
American male television actors
American male voice actors
American people of English descent
American people of German descent
American people of Irish descent
American people of Scottish descent
American people of Welsh descent
Audiobook narrators
Baptists from California
Best Directing Academy Award winners
Best Director Golden Globe winners
Best Miniseries or Television Movie Actor Golden Globe winners
César Honorary Award recipients
California Democrats
California State University, Fullerton alumni
Directors Guild of America Award winners
Film directors from California
Film producers from California
Golden Globe Award-winning producers
Living people
Male actors from Los Angeles
Male actors from Greater Los Angeles
Male Western (genre) film actors
Outstanding Performance by a Lead Actor in a Miniseries or Movie Primetime Emmy Award winners
Outstanding Performance by a Male Actor in a Miniseries or Television Movie Screen Actors Guild Award winners
People from Lynwood, California
Actors from Orange County, California
Producers who won the Best Picture Academy Award
Show Dog-Universal Music artists
Singer-songwriters from California
Western (genre) film directors
People from Compton, California
Outstanding Performance by a Cast in a Motion Picture Screen Actors Guild Award winners
Country musicians from California